House of the Wolf Man is an American independent monster horror film produced in 2009 by My Way Pictures. The film was inspired by the Universal Monsters movies, and was shot in the same style. The film's star Ron Chaney is the great-grandson of Lon Chaney and the grandson of Lon Chaney, Jr., both of whom starred in numerous Universal Monsters films.

Plot
Dr. Bela Reinhardt (Ron Chaney) is a mad doctor who has invited five people to his castle to determine which of them shall inherit his estate. He has arranged for a competition of sorts. The winner will be chosen by process of...elimination.
The visitors quickly realize they have made a terrible mistake in accepting Reinhardt's invitation, but are trapped like rats in a cage under the watchful eye of Reinhardt's ghoulish manservant, Barlow. They soon discover the castle is full of terrifying monsters such as the Wolf Man, Frankenstein's monster, and Dracula.

Cast
 Ron Chaney as Bela Reinhardt
 Dustin Fitzsimons as Reed Chapel
 Jeremie Loncka as Conrad Sullivan
 Sara Raftery as Mary Chapel
 Cheryl Rodes as Elmira Cray
 Jim Thalman as Archibald Whitlock
 John McGarr as Barlow
 Billy Bussey as the Wolf Man
 Craig Dabbs as Frankenstein's Monster
 Michael R. Thomas as Dracula
 Saba Moor-Doucette as Vadoma

Production notes
House of the Wolf Man is an homage to classic horror films, shot in black and white and 1:33 aspect ratio (full frame).

References

External links
 
 Official Site

Frankenstein films
Dracula films
American werewolf films
American supernatural horror films
American black-and-white films
American vampire films
Films set in castles
2000s English-language films
2000s American films